The VSR SR-1 Snoshoo is an American homebuilt Formula One racing aircraft that was designed by Alan VanMeter and A.J. Smith and produced by VanMeter Smith Racing (VSR) of Wichita, Kansas. It was designed in 1993 and first flown in 1997. The aircraft is supplied in the form of plans for amateur construction, with some key parts available to speed construction.

Design and development
The SR-1 Snoshoo features a cantilever mid-wing, a single-seat enclosed cockpit under a bubble canopy, fixed conventional landing gear with wheel pants and a single engine in tractor configuration.

The aircraft fuselage is made from welded 4130 steel tubing covered in carbon-fiber-reinforced polymer fairings ahead of the wing and doped aircraft fabric aft. The aircraft is stressed to +/-8 g

The designers estimate the construction time from the supplied plans as 1500 hours.

Operational history
By 1998 the company reported that 20 kits and sets of plans had been sold.

In March 2014 one example was registered in the United States with the Federal Aviation Administration.

Specifications (SR-1 Snoshoo)

References

External links

Official photos of the SR-1 prototype

Snoshoo
1990s United States sport aircraft
Single-engined tractor aircraft
Mid-wing aircraft
Homebuilt aircraft
Aircraft first flown in 1997